Romain Wattel (born 10 January 1991) is a French professional golfer.

Career
In September 2010, Wattel became just the fifth amateur to win on the European Challenge Tour, when he captured the Allianz EurOpen Strasbourg. It was the second win by an amateur during the 2010 season following Andreas Hartø two weeks previously.

Wattel turned professional in November 2010. He established himself on the European Tour, with best performances of second at the 2012 Omega European Masters and the 2015 Trophée Hassan II.

Wattel finished 28th in the 2014 Race to Dubai. This gave him entry to the 2015 Open Championship where he missed the cut. He qualified for the 2016 U.S. Open, via sectional qualifying in May, and finished 63rd. In September 2017 he had his first win on the European Tour, winning the KLM Open by a stroke from Austin Connelly.

Amateur wins
2008 Coupe Frayssineau-Mouchy
2009 Argentine Amateur Championship, Junior Orange Bowl Championship, French Open Boys Championship
2010 Scottish Amateur Stroke Play Championship, Coupe Frayssineau-Mouchy, Scratch Players Championship

Professional wins (3)

European Tour wins (1)

Challenge Tour wins (1)

Hi5 Pro Tour wins (1)

Results in major championships

CUT = missed the halfway cut
"T" = tied

Team appearances
Amateur
European Boys' Team Championship (representing France): 2007, 2008, 2009
Jacques Léglise Trophy (representing the Continent of Europe): 2008, 2009
European Amateur Team Championship (representing France): 2009, 2010
Bonallack Trophy (representing Europe): 2010 (selected, but tournament cancelled)
St Andrews Trophy (representing the Continent of Europe): 2010 (winners)
Eisenhower Trophy (representing France): 2010 (winners)

See also
2010 European Tour Qualifying School graduates

References

External links
 

French male golfers
European Tour golfers
Sportspeople from Montpellier
1991 births
Living people